Nimmakuru is a village in Krishna district of the Indian state of Andhra Pradesh. It is located in Pamarru mandal of Gudivada revenue division.

References

Villages in Krishna district